was a feudal domain under the Tokugawa shogunate of Edo period Japan, in Harima Province in what is now the south-central portion of modern-day Hyōgo Prefecture. It was centered around the Ono jin'ya which was located in what is now the city of Ono, Hyōgo. It was controlled by the tozama daimyō Hitotsuyanagi clan throughout its history.

History
Hitotsuyanagi Naomori was established as daimyō of the 50,000 koku Kanbe Domain under the Tokugawa shogunate in 1601. In 1636, he was awarded with a further increase in kokudaka to 68,000 koku and was transferred to Saijō Domain in Iyo Province. On his death, he divided his holdings between his three sons, with his second son, Hitotsuyanagi Naoie, receiving 23,000 koku and the new title of daimyō of "Kawanoe Domain" in Iyo. This was in addition to the 5000 koku he already had in Harima Province. However, in 1642, he suddenly died shortly after arriving in Edo on sankin kōtai due to a furuncle on his face. As he had no heir, the domain hurriedly married his daughter to the second son of Koide Yoshichika of Sonobe Domain and to arrange a posthumous adoption to avoid attainder. The attempt was only partially successful, as the shogunate used this as an excuse to seize most of the domain's holdings in Iyo, leaving him with only 10,000 koku.

The third through ninth daimyō served in the shogunate in the minor role of Sumpu kaban; however, from the time of the 5th daimyō Hitotsuyanagi Suenaga, the domain's finances deteriorated. In 1833, towards the end of the tenure of the 9th daimyō Hitotsuyanagi Suenobu, large-scale peasant uprisings occurred. In 1836, the han school, Kishokan, was opened. Under the 11th and final daimyō Hitotsuyanagi Suemori, the domain was an early supporter of the imperial cause in the Boshin War.  In 1871, with the abolition of the han system, the domain became "Ono Prefecture", which was merged with "Shikama Prefecture", which in turn became part of Hyōgo Prefecture.

The Hitotsuyanagi clan was ennobled with the kazoku peerage title of shishaku (viscount) in 1884. 

The site of the Ono Jin'ya is now the location of Ono Elementary School. In addition to a stone monument, a small portion of earthen wall still exists.

Holdings at the end of the Edo period
As with most domains in the han system, Ono Domain consisted of several discontinuous territories calculated to provide the assigned kokudaka, based on periodic cadastral surveys and projected agricultural yields.

Harima Province 
30 villages in Katō District

List of daimyō 

{| class=wikitable
! #||Name || Tenure || Courtesy title || Court Rank || kokudaka 
|-
|colspan=6|  Hitotsuyanagi clan, 1636-1871 (Tozama)
|-
||1||||1636 - 1642||Mimasaka-no-kami (美作守)||Junior 5th Rank, Lower Grade (従五位下)||28,000 koku
|-
||2||||1642 - 1658||Tosa-no-kami (土佐守)|| Junior 5th Rank, Lower Grade (従五位下)||10,000 koku
|-
||3||||1658 - 1712||Tsushima-no-kami (対馬守); Tosa-no-kami (土佐守)|| Junior 5th Rank, Lower Grade (従五位下)||10,000 koku
|-
||4||||1712 - 1737||Tsushima-no-kami (対馬守); Tosa-no-kami (土佐守)|| Junior 5th Rank, Lower Grade (従五位下)||10,000 koku
|-
||5||||1737 - 1779||Tsushima-no-kami (対馬守); Tosa-no-kami (土佐守)|| Junior 5th Rank, Lower Grade (従五位下)||10,000 koku
|-
||6||||1779 - 1804|| Tosa-no-kami (土佐守); Sakyo-daibu (左京亮) || Junior 5th Rank, Lower Grade (従五位下)||10,000 koku
|-
||7||||1804 - 1812||Tosa-no-kami (土佐守)|| Junior 5th Rank, Lower Grade (従五位下)||10,000 koku
|-
||8||||1812 - 1821||Tsushima-no-kami (対馬守)|| Junior 5th Rank, Lower Grade (従五位下)||10,000 koku
|-
||9||||1821 - 1855||Tosa-no-kami (土佐守)|| Junior 5th Rank, Lower Grade (従五位下)||10,000 koku
|-
||10||||1856 - 1863||Tsushima-no-kami (対馬守); Tosa-no-kami (土佐守)|| Junior 5th Rank, Lower Grade (従五位下)||10,000 koku
|-
||11||||1863 - 1871||Tsushima-no-kami (対馬守)|| 2nd Rank (従二位)||10,000 koku
|-
|}

See also 
 List of Han
 Abolition of the han system

Further reading
 Bolitho, Harold. (1974). Treasures Among Men: The Fudai Daimyo in Tokugawa Japan. New Haven: Yale University Press.  ;  OCLC 185685588

References

Domains of Japan
1871 disestablishments in Japan
States and territories disestablished in 1871
Harima Province
History of Hyōgo Prefecture